Movie Movie is a 1978 American double bill directed by Stanley Donen. It consists of two films: Dynamite Hands, a boxing ring morality play, and Baxter's Beauties of 1933, a musical comedy, both starring the husband-and-wife team of George C. Scott and Trish Van Devere. A fake trailer for a flying-ace movie set in World War I titled Zero Hour (also starring Scott) is shown between the double feature.

Barry Bostwick, Red Buttons, Art Carney and Eli Wallach appear in both segments, with Harry Hamlin, Barbara Harris and Ann Reinking featured in one each. The script was written by Larry Gelbart and Sheldon Keller.

Plot
The film is introduced by George "The Burns" Burns, who tells viewers that they are about to see an old-style double feature.  In the old days, he explains, movies were in black-and-white except sometimes "when they sang it came out in color."

Dynamite Hands
Joey Popchik, a young man from a poor family, dreams of one day becoming a lawyer. His sister is losing her eyesight, so he becomes a boxer to raise the money to have her cured. Along the way, he gets seduced by fame and fortune, and runs afoul of a crooked boxing manager. In the end, his sister is cured, and Joey, so that "poetic justice could be served," races through law school to become the prosecutor who puts the villain behind bars, spouting corny courtroom aphorisms such as "a man can move mountains with his bare heart."

Baxter's Beauties of 1933
Legendary theatrical producer Spats Baxter learns he's dying. To support the daughter he's never known after he's gone, he plans to create one last Broadway smash. Kitty Simpson, a young ingenue with dreams of performing on Broadway, arrives to audition. Baxter's accountant is at heart a genius songwriter Dick Cummings. Baxter's star, Isobel Stuart, is a spoiled actress who almost destroys the entire production with her drunkenness and reckless spending of the show's money. In the end, Kitty must go in Isobel's place. Kitty becomes a star, and learns that Baxter is her long-lost father. As the curtain falls, a dying Baxter tells her "One minute you're standing in the wings, the next minute you're wearing 'em."

Cast
 George C. Scott as "Gloves" Malloy / "Spats" Baxter
 Trish Van Devere as Betsy McGuire / Isobel Stuart
 Red Buttons as "Peanuts" / "Jinks" Murphy
 Eli Wallach as Vince Marlow / Pop
 Rebecca York as Kitty
 Harry Hamlin as Joey Popchik
 Ann Reinking as "Troubles" Moran
 Jocelyn Brando as Mama Popchik / Mrs. Updike
 Michael Kidd as Pop Popchik
 Kathleen Beller as Angie Popchik
 Barry Bostwick as Johnny Danko / Dick Cummings
 Art Carney as Dr. Blaine / Dr. Bowers
 Clay Hodges as "Sailor" Lawson
 George P. Wilbur as Tony Norton
 Peter Stader as Barney Keegle (as Peter T. Stader)
 Jimmy Lennon as The Announcer (as James Lennon)
 Barbara Harris as Trixie Lane
 Charles Lane as The Judge / Mr. Pennington
 Stanley Donen as Nightclub Emcee / Cab Driver (uncredited)
 George Burns as himself, Introductory Segments (uncredited)

Production
The film originally was called Double Feature and was based on an idea of Larry Gelbart. He pitched the project in 1975 and was successful at Universal. He says it took him and co-writer Sheldon Keller six weeks to write the film and six months to get paid. In June 1976,  Universal announced Gelbart would write, direct, and produce the film.

The studio disliked the script and allowed Gelbart to take it elsewhere. Gelbart showed it to Martin Starger, the American representative of Lew Grade. Both Starger and Grade loved the script; Grade had been a backer of Gelbart's Sly Fox and he agreed to finance Double Feature.

The budget was $6 million. Stanley Donen agreed to direct.  Filming started in October 1977.

It was decided to shoot the film using color stock that could be printed in black-and-white to give the filmmakers the option of showing the film in black-and-white or color. The title was changed to Movie Movie because it was felt Double Feature might be confusing. There were plans to include a Flash Gordon-type serial, but this was not filmed.

George C. Scott said "Gelbart is such a good writer and the picture was so much fun I was almost ashamed to take the money."

The film was previewed extensively. As a result of the preview, a newsreel used to open the film was dropped, along with a trailer for a fake movie. A new ending was shot for "Dynamite Hands," which took one day. A prologue was added starring George Burns, in which Burns explained what double features were.

Release
The film premiered at the Sutton Theatre in New York City on November 22, 1978. In the theatrical release, as George Burns leads us to expect in the film's prologue, "Dynamite Hands" and the mock film trailer (for Zero Hour, a flying-ace movie set in World War I) were in black-and-white, and the musical "Baxter's Beauties of 1933" was in color.

Proposed sequel
Lew Grade liked the movie so much that he commissioned a sequel. In October 1978, he said this would be called Movie Movie Two and would be written by Gelbart and Keller and once more directed by Donen. Gelbart wrote a script which is among his papers at UCLA, but it went unproduced.

The movie failed at the box office. Grade blamed poor distribution from Warner Bros. This contributed to Grade deciding to help set up his own distribution company, Associated Film Distribution, with ultimately disastrous financial consequences for him and his company.

Home media
Some home video editions (like the 1980 Magnetic Video Corporation edition) featured the original color version of "Dynamite Hands" that was printed on black-and-white film stock during its theatrical release.

The film was released on Blu-ray by Scorpion Releasing June 28, 2016.

Awards and honors

See also
 Grindhouse (2007), a similar double-bill concept
 B movie
 Classical Hollywood cinema

References

External links

1978 films
1970s musical comedy films
1970s parody films
American musical comedy films
American parody films
American anthology films
American boxing films
Films directed by Stanley Donen
ITC Entertainment films
Films with screenplays by Larry Gelbart
Warner Bros. films
1978 comedy films
1970s English-language films
1970s American films